Dale Wilson may refer to:

 Dale Wilson (politician) (born 1953), Australian politician
 Dale Wilson (actor) (born 1950), Canadian voice actor

See also
 Dave Wilson (disambiguation)